Hugh Rodham can be:
 Hugh Rodham (born 1911) (1911—1993), American businessman, politician and merchant (father of Hillary Clinton)
 Hugh Rodham (born 1950), American lawyer, businessman and politician (brother of Hillary Clinton)